Naaga is a 2003 Indian Telugu-language political action film starring N. T. Rama Rao Jr., Sadaf, Jennifer Kotwal and  Raghuvaran in main roles. The film is directed by D.K Suresh.  The film was released on 10 January 2003.  The film's score was by Vidyasagar and Deva.

Cast

N. T. Rama Rao Jr. as Suryadevara Nagaraju "Naaga"
Sadaf as Vijji
Jennifer Kotwal
Raghuvaran as Naaga's father
Nassar as Chief Minister
Rajan P. Dev as Home Minister
Sudeepa Pinky as Naaga's sister
Shakeela as Mandaram
Paruchuri Gopala Krishna as Potti Kasaiah
Sunil as Ravi
Varsha
Sudha
Srinivasa Reddy
Siva Reddy
Prithvi
Babloo Prithiveeraj
Anand
Rajeev Kanakala
Venu Madhav
L.B. Sriram
P. J. Sarma
M. S. Narayana
Rambha as an item number in the song "Naayudori Pilla"
Anasuya Bharadwaj in an uncredited role as a law college student in the song "Dhool"
Surya
Raghava Lawrence in a guest appearance in the song "Naayudori Pilla"

Soundtrack
The music was composed by Deva and Vidyasagar. The music of "Entha Chinna Muddu" and "Anakapalli Centrelo" were reused from two songs of Dhool (Tamil film), another film that Vidyasagar composed the music for. Macarina Macarina, Megham Karigenu, and Oka Konte Pillane were reused from the Tamil film Kushi. The soundtrack version of Oka Konte Pillane featured vocals of Karthik while the film version utilized vocals provided by Hariharan.

Release
It was dubbed in Hindi as Mera Kanoon.

References

External links

2000s Telugu-language films
2003 films
Films scored by Deva (composer)
Films scored by Vidyasagar